Southern Region or South Region may refer to:

 Southern Nigeria
 Southern Region (Boy Scouts of America)
 Southern Region, Bauchi, Nigeria
 South Region, Brazil, an official grouping of states for economic and statistical purposes
 Southern Region (Eritrea)
 Southern Region (Iceland)
 Southern Region, Ireland, statistical region
 Southern Region, Malawi
 Southern Region, Malta
 Southern Region, Serbia
 Southern Region of British Railways
 Southern Thailand, Thailand
 South Region (Cameroon)

See also
 Southern Chile (wine region)
 Central Region (disambiguation)
 Eastern Region (disambiguation)
 Northern Region (disambiguation)
 Western Region (disambiguation)